In mathematics, the inverse scattering transform is a method for solving some non-linear partial differential equations. The method is a non-linear analogue, and in some sense generalization, of the Fourier transform, which itself is applied to solve many linear partial differential equations. The name "inverse scattering method" comes from the key idea of recovering the time evolution of a potential from the time evolution of its scattering data: inverse scattering refers to the problem of recovering a potential from its scattering matrix, as opposed to the direct scattering problem of finding the scattering matrix from the potential.

The inverse scattering transform may be applied to many of the so-called exactly solvable models, that is to say completely integrable infinite dimensional systems.

Overview
It was later used to solve many other equations, such as the Kadomtsev–Petviashvili equation, the Ishimori equation,  the Dym equation, and so on. A further family of examples is provided by the Bogomolny equations (for a given gauge group and oriented Riemannian 3-fold), the  solutions of which are magnetic monopoles.

A characteristic of solutions obtained by the inverse scattering method is the existence of solitons, solutions resembling both particles and waves, which have no analogue for linear partial differential equations. The term "soliton" arises from non-linear optics.

The inverse scattering problem can be written as a Riemann–Hilbert factorization problem, at least in the case of equations of one space dimension. This formulation can be generalized to differential operators of order greater than 2 and  also to  periodic potentials.
In higher space dimensions one has instead a "nonlocal"  Riemann–Hilbert factorization problem (with convolution instead of multiplication) or a d-bar problem.

Example: the Korteweg–de Vries equation

The Korteweg–de Vries equation is a nonlinear, dispersive, evolution partial differential equation for a function u; of two real variables, one space variable x and one time variable t :

To solve the initial value problem for this equation where  is a known function of x, one associates to this equation the Schrödinger eigenvalue equation

The constant  is an eigenvalue.

From the Schrödinger equation we obtain 

Substituting this into the Korteweg–de Vries equation and integrating gives the equation

where C and D are constants.

Method of solution
Step 1. Determine the nonlinear partial differential equation. This is usually accomplished by analyzing the physics of the situation being studied.

Step 2. Employ forward scattering. This consists in finding the Lax pair. It is extremely important that the eigenvalue  be independent of time; i.e.

Rearranging on the far right term gives us

Thus,

Since , this implies that  if and only if

This is Lax's equation.

where u is the "potential". Comparing the expression  with  shows us that  thus ignoring the first term.

After concocting the appropriate Lax pair it should be the case that Lax's equation recovers the original nonlinear PDE.

Step 3. Determine the time evolution of the eigenfunctions associated to each eigenvalue , the norming constants, and the reflection coefficient, all three comprising the so-called scattering data. This time evolution is given by a system of linear ordinary differential equations which can be solved.

Step 4. Perform the inverse scattering procedure by solving the Gelfand–Levitan–Marchenko integral equation (Israel Moiseevich Gelfand and Boris Moiseevich Levitan; Vladimir Aleksandrovich Marchenko), a linear integral equation, to obtain the final solution of the original nonlinear PDE. All the scattering data is required in order to do this. If the reflection coefficient is zero, the process becomes much easier. This step works if  is a differential or difference operator of order two, but not necessarily for higher orders. In all cases however, the inverse scattering problem is reducible to a Riemann–Hilbert factorization problem.
(See Ablowitz-Clarkson (1991) for either approach. See Marchenko (1986) for a mathematical rigorous treatment.)

Examples of integrable equations
 Korteweg–de Vries equation
 nonlinear Schrödinger equation
 Camassa-Holm equation
 Sine-Gordon equation
 Toda lattice
 Ishimori equation
 Dym equation

Further examples of integrable equations may be found on the article Integrable system.

References

M. Ablowitz, H. Segur, Solitons and the Inverse Scattering Transform, SIAM, Philadelphia, 1981.
N. Asano, Y. Kato, Algebraic and Spectral Methods for Nonlinear Wave Equations, Longman Scientific & Technical, Essex, England, 1990.
M. Ablowitz, P. Clarkson, Solitons, Nonlinear Evolution Equations and Inverse Scattering, Cambridge University Press, Cambridge, 1991.

 
V. A. Marchenko, "Sturm-Liouville Operators and Applications",  Birkhäuser, Basel, 1986.
J. Shaw, Mathematical Principles of Optical Fiber Communications, SIAM, Philadelphia, 2004.
 Eds: R.K. Bullough, P.J. Caudrey. "Solitons" Topics in Current Physics 17. Springer Verlag, Berlin-Heidelberg-New York, 1980.

External links
  
 Inverse Scattering Transform and the Theory of Solitons

Scattering theory
Exactly solvable models
Partial differential equations
Transforms
Integrable systems